Dodonaea viscosa, also known as the broadleaf hopbush, is a species of flowering plant in the Dodonaea (hopbush) genus that has a cosmopolitan distribution in tropical, subtropical and warm temperate regions of Africa, the Americas, southern Asia and Australasia. Dodonaea is part of Sapindaceae, the soapberry family.

This species is notable for its extremely wide distribution, which it achieved only over the last 2 million years (from its region of origin in Australia) via oceanic dispersal. Harrington and Gadek (2009) referred to D. viscosa as having "a distribution equal to some world’s greatest transoceanic dispersers".

Common names
The common name hopbush is used for D. viscosa specifically and also for the genus as a whole.

In the south Indian state of Tamil Nadu, this plant is called virāli (விராலி).

Australian common names include: broad leaf hopbush, candlewood, giant hopbush, narrow leaf hopbush, sticky hopbush, native hop bush, soapwood, switchsorrel, wedge leaf hopbush, and native hop. The Wiradjuri people of New South Wales use the name Bururr.

Additional common names include: aalii and ‘a‘ali‘i-ku ma kua and ‘a‘ali‘i ku makani in the Hawaiian language; akeake (New Zealand); lampuaye (Guam); mesechelangel (Palau); chirca (Uruguay, Argentina); Xayramad (Somalia); romerillo (Sonora, Mexico); jarilla (southern Mexico); hayuelo (Colombia); ch'akatea (Bolivia); casol caacol (Seri); ghoraskai (Afghanistan).

Taxonomy 
Phylogenetic evidence supports D. viscosa being the sister species to D. camfieldii, a species endemic to a small portion of coastal New South Wales in Australia.

Subspecies and synonyms 
There are several subspecies as follows:
Dodonaea viscosa subsp. angustifolia 
Dodonaea viscosa subsp. angustissima 
Dodonaea viscosa subsp. arizonica 
Dodonaea viscosa subsp. cuneata 
Dodonaea viscosa subsp. elaeagnoides 
Dodonaea viscosa subsp. mucronata 
Dodonaea viscosa subsp. spatulata 
Dodonaea viscosa  subsp. viscosa

Botanical synonyms
 D. eriocarpa Sm.
 D. sandwicensis Sherff
 D. stenocarpa Hillebr.

Systematics 
It has been identified that D. viscosa split into two intraspecific groups, known as groups I and II, in the Pleistocene, about 1.1–2.1 Ma (million years ago) (95% Highest Posterior Density, HPD). These two intraspecific groups are distributed differently within Australia. Group I plants are strandline shrubs growing from north-eastern Queensland to the New South Wales border. This clade has a number of genetically divergent lineages (I:a,b,c,d,e,f,g,). It is identified that subclade Ib shared a last common ancestor with subclade Ia in the mid-Pleistocene, 0.5–1.2 Ma. 

 Group I a: D. viscosa Pagan, D. viscosa ssp viscosa Yorkeys Knob Beach, D. viscosa ssp viscosa Trinity Beach, D. viscosa ssp viscosa Clifton Beach, D. viscosa ssp viscosa Wonga Beach, D. viscosa Tanzania2, D. viscosa ssp viscosa Airlie Beach, D. viscosa Virgin Islands.
 Group I b: D. viscosa Maui Ulupalakua, D. viscosa, Hawaii Pohakuloa, D. viscosa Maui PoliPoli, D. viscosa Hawaii Kona, D. viscosa Hawaii Kauai.
 Group I c: D. viscosa Arizona 1, D. viscosa Arizona 2, D. viscosa Mexico, D. viscosa Brazil, D. viscosa Columbia, D. viscosa Bolivia
 Group I d: D. viscosa Taiwan 1, D. viscosa Taiwan 2, D. viscosa Japan, D. viscosa China, D. viscosa Tanzania1.
 Group I e:  D. viscosa Oman, D. viscosa South Africa1, D. viscosa India
 Group I f: D. viscosa South Africa 3, D. viscosa South Africa 4, D. South Africa 2, D. viscosa New Caledonia 1, D. viscosa New Caledonia 2, D. viscosa Papua New Guinea
 Group I g: D. viscosa ssp burmanniana 1, D. viscosa ssp burmanniana 2

The Group II of D. viscosa is present almost everywhere on the continent. Group II has at least three evolutionary lineages (II a, b and c), which distributions generally overlap. According to West these subspecies have morphological intergradation, particularly in the higher-rainfall regions of Australia, but not in the arid zone, where they generally overlap. There is also a hypothesis of ongoing gene flow between D. procumbens and D. viscosa's Group II resulting from hybridization events of two populations in central regions of South Australia. The Group II members are believed to have dispersed in the mid-Pleistocene (0.5–1.2 Ma) from mainland Australia to New Zealand.

 Group II a: D. viscosa New Zealand South Island 2, D. viscosa New Zealand South Island 3, D. viscosa New Zealand South Island 1, D. viscosa New Zealand North Island 4, D. viscosa ssp angustissima 1, D.viscosa ssp angustissima 3, D. viscosa ssp angustissima 2.
 Group II b: D. viscosa ssp spatulata, D. viscosa ssp cuneata, D. viscosa ssp angustifolia, D. procumbens, D. procumbens 2.
 Group II c: D. biloba, D. viscosa ssp mucronata.

Description
Many specimens have a pointed or rounded apex. Leaf base is extended. Leaf texture is leathery, tough, but also pliable. Midribs are medium becoming less visible close to the apex. Secondary veins are thin, generally indistinct; Veins: often 6 to 10 pairs, indifferently opposite, subopposite, and alternate, camptodrome. Venation branches from the midrib at different angles, which may vary from 12° to 70°. The basal veins are very ascending in some plants: the angle of divergence may be close to 45°. The basal secondary venation branches from a point near the base of the main vein and becomes parallel with the leaf margin, with the distance of 1 millimeter to 2 millimeters from the edges. Margins are usually toothed or undulating. The remaining secondary veins lay at regular intervals with flowers usually growing at the branches’ ends.

The flowers may be only male or female ones, and one plant bears either male or female flowers. However, sometimes they are observed to bear flowers of both sexes. The pollen is transported by anemophily. It is believed that the flowers lack petals during evolution to increase exposure to the wind. The fruit is a capsule  broad, red ripening brown, with two to four wings.

Uses
The wood is extremely tough and durable. In New Zealand, where it is the heaviest of any native wood, the Māori have traditionally used it for making weapons, carved walking staves, axe-handles, and weights on drill shafts. D. viscosa is used by the people from the western part of the island of New Guinea, Southeast Asia, West Africa and Brazil for house building and as firewood. Its leaves may also be used as plasters for wounds.

Native Hawaiians made pou (house posts), laau melomelo (fishing lures), and ōō (digging sticks) from aalii wood and a red dye from the fruit.

The cultivar 'Purpurea', with purple foliage, is widely grown as a garden shrub. Dodonaea viscosa easily occupies open areas and secondary forest, and is resistant to salinity, drought and pollution. It can be used for dune stabilization, remediation of polluted lands and for reforestation. The plant is tolerant to strong winds, and therefore is commonly used as hedge, windbreak, and decorative shrub.

The Seri use the plant medicinally. It was also used to stimulate lactation in mothers, as a dysentery treatment, to cure digestive system disorders, skin problems and rheumatism in Africa and Asia. In New Guinea, people use it as incense for funerals. In the past D. viscosa was used instead of hops for beer brewing by Australians (as reflected in the name “hopbush”).

Cultivation
Dodonaea viscosa can be grown from seeds. However, pre-treatment of the seed in very hot water may be needed. The plant can also be cultivated by taking cuttings. Sometimes this method is also used to obtain female plants with their winged fruits for the aesthetic value. Hopbush can survive long dry periods and is easily cultivated without heavy feeding.

References

External links
Dodonaea viscosa. Bermuda Dept. of Conservation Services.
 

viscosa
Trees of Australia
Flora of Tasmania
Trees of New Zealand
Trees of the Southwestern United States
Flora of California
Trees of the Southeastern United States
Trees of Hawaii
Trees of Mexico
Flora of Northwestern Mexico
Trees of South Africa
Flora of the Tubuai Islands
Trees of Bermuda
Rosids of Western Australia
Flora of the Northern Territory
Flora of Queensland
Flora of New South Wales
Flora of South Australia
Sapindales of Australia
Plants described in 1760
Taxa named by Nikolaus Joseph von Jacquin
Garden plants of Australasia
Garden plants of North America
Ornamental trees
Shrubs
Drought-tolerant plants